Sopanam is a 1993 Malayalam drama film directed by Jayaraj, starring J. V. Somayajulu, Manoj K. Jayan, Chippy in lead roles. Scripted by Kaithapram Damodaran Namboothiri, this film tells the story of a singer who loves his teacher's daughter.

Plot
Ananthu is a gifted singer who has not learned singing professionally. His hearts for learning singing from Varma Thampuran. Varma likes him and takes him in as his disciple. Varma also teaches him about the characteristics of wise man is to be humble and have the right devotion to his teacher and god, also says what drives a man is his understanding and anger. Ananthu and Anju falls in love. Varma discovers this and is angered. He asks Ananthu to not to show his face again at his home. Ananthu takes it as a punishment and leaves. However, his departure disturbs Anju psychologically. Varma has stopped singing, because he is not able to find rhythm anymore. He is traveling with his daughters from one temple to another. On such an occasion, he sees Ananthu. Ananthu now is a famous singer and he learns of Varma's hardships. After seeing Anju's fate. He asks her hand in marriage from Varma. Varma from previous guilt and hope that his daughter will return to her health, agrees to it.

Cast
J. V. Somayajulu as Rajaraja Varma Thampuran
Manoj K. Jayan as Ananthakrishna Warrier aka Ananthu
Chippy as Anju Varma
Oduvil Unnikrishnan as Puthumana Potti
Kaviyoor Ponnamma as Sethulakshmi Varma 
Sankaradi as Marar
M. S. Thripunithura as Temple priest
Seena Antony as Unnimaya
Bindu Panicker as Shobha Manoharan
Kozhikode Narayanan Nair
Maniyanpilla Raju as Manoharan Varma
Kunchan as Kushini
Kaithapram Damodaran Namboothiri as Ilayaraj
Thilakan as Warrier Uncle
V K Sreeraman as Illaya Varma Thampuran

Soundtrack

Awards

References

External links
 

1990s Malayalam-language films
1993 drama films
1993 films
1990s musical drama films
Films scored by S. P. Venkatesh
Indian musical drama films